Mercuria similis is a species of small freshwater snail with an operculum, an aquatic gastropod mollusk in the family Hydrobiidae.

This species only tolerates very low salinities, and is perhaps better characterized as a freshwater snail.

Description
The 3–4 mm. high shell is fragile and translucent yellow-white in colour (but often coated with dark deposits). The animal is entirely and uniformly pale and has pale tentacles. Mercuria similis has a proportionately larger body whorl than other hydrobiids.

The shell is short-conical and 3.90–4.50 mm high  (Vic-la-Gardiole, Hérault), with a large oval aperture. The penis is long and slim, acute at its distal end, the penial appendix is broad and shorter than the penis which lies on the appendix.

Geographic distribution
 This species is native to France, Italy, Malta, Algeria, Tunisia and Morocco.
 Great Britain
 Ireland
 Netherlands

References 

Peter Glöer, Hans D. Boeters, Frank Walther Species of the genus Mercuria Boeters, 1971 (Caenogastropoda: Truncatelloidea: Hydrobiidae) from the European Mediterranean region, Morocco and Madeira, with descriptions of new species Folia Malacologica 11/2015; 23(4). DOI: 10.12657/folmal.023.024 online Description, images

External links
 
 MolluscIreland

Hydrobiidae
Gastropods described in 1805
Taxonomy articles created by Polbot